Fire Station No. 25 may refer to:

Fire Station No. 25 (Seattle, Washington), listed on the National Register of Historic Places (NRHP)
Engine Company 25 (Washington, D.C.), NRHP-listed

See also
List of fire stations